The tongue map or taste map is a common misconception that different sections of the tongue are exclusively responsible for different basic tastes. It is illustrated with a schematic map of the tongue, with certain parts of the tongue labeled for each taste. Although widely taught in schools, this has been scientifically disproved by later research; all taste sensations come from all regions of the tongue, although different parts are more sensitive to certain tastes.

History 
The theory behind this map originated from a paper written by Harvard psychologist Dirk P. Hänig, which was a translation of a German paper, Zur Psychophysik des Geschmackssinnes, which was written in 1901. The unclear representation of data in the earlier paper suggested that each part of the tongue tastes exactly one basic taste.

The paper showed minute differences in threshold detection levels across the tongue, but these differences were later taken out of context and the minute difference in threshold sensitivity was misconstrued in textbooks as a difference in sensation.

While some parts of the tongue may be able to detect a taste before the others do, all parts are equally capable of conveying the qualia of all tastes. Threshold sensitivity may differ across the tongue, but intensity of sensation does not.

The same paper included a taste bud distribution diagram that showed a "taste belt".

In 1974, Virginia Collings investigated the topic again, and confirmed that all the tastes exist on all parts of the tongue.

Into the late 1970's tongue map experiments were a teaching tool in high school biology classes.  Students were given strips of paper with different tastes on them and told where each sweet/salty/etc. taste should be more noticeable.  They then were instructed to touch those taste strips on different areas of their lab partner's tongue and record the (proper) sensation result.

Taste belt 
The misinterpreted diagram that sparked this myth shows human taste buds distributed in a "taste belt" along the inside of the tongue.

Prior to this, A. Hoffmann had concluded in 1875 that the dorsal center of the human tongue has practically no fungiform papillae and taste buds, and it was this finding that the diagram describes.

References 

Misconceptions
Gustation
Tongue